Elk Pass can refer to:
Elk Pass (Canada), through the Rocky Mountains in Alberta and British Columbia, Canada.
Elk Pass (Washington), through the Cascade Mountains in Washington state, United States
 Elk Pass in Mountain passes in Montana